Tilikum v. Sea World (Tilikum et al. v. Sea World Parks & Entertainment Inc., 842 F. Supp. 2d 1259 (S.D. Cal. 2012)) was a legal case heard in the US Federal Court in 2012 concerning the constitutional standing of an orca.  It was brought by People for the Ethical Treatment of Animals (PETA) on behalf of Tilikum, an orca kept in the SeaWorld Orlando park, against the SeaWorld corporation.

The plaintiff asked the court to rule that the terms of the Thirteenth Amendment to the United States Constitution applied to Tilikum, and thus that the orca's confinement amounted to involuntary servitude or slavery. The court held that the Thirteenth Amendment only applied to persons and that Tilikum was not a person, and so was not afforded constitutional protections.

Background 
Tilikum was a bull killer whale (Orcinus orca) bought by the SeaWorld marine park in Orlando, Florida in 1992 to be part of the park's orca exhibit. He was the largest orca in captivity. The other whales named as plaintiffs in the suit are Katina, who is also kept in Orlando, and Corky, Kasatka, and Ulises who are kept in SeaWorld San Diego.

A year prior to the case, Tilikum killed his handler and fellow performer, Dawn Brancheau. On February 24, 2010, Brancheau began her "Dine with Shamu" show with Tilikum just as she had many times before. However, this show ended by Tilikum reacting poorly to Dawn's request. While Brancheau interacted with Tilikum before a live audience, he grabbed Brancheau and dragged her into the water. He held her at the bottom of the pool, ripping part of her scalp from her skull, breaking her jaw, fracturing vertebrae, and killing her. Tilikum was also one of three orcas that killed trainer Keltie Byrne in 1991, and in 1999 the dead body of Daniel P. Dukes was found draped over his back.

Complaint 
On 25 October 2011 animal rights organization PETA brought a constitutional lawsuit in the United States District Court for the Southern District of California as next friends of the orcas.  They asserted the wording of the US Constitution is not expressly limited to humans, and that orcas are entitled to protection under 13th Amendment.

PETA said that the whales "were born free and lived in their natural environment until they were captured and torn from their families."  The complaint alleged the circumstances in which the whales are held results in them experiencing "extreme physiological and mental stress" and that their lifespans were shortened to "8.5 years in captivity versus up to 65 years in the wild." The lawsuit asked the court to rule that the orcas were held in illegal involuntary servitude.

SeaWorld called the action "baseless" and a "publicity stunt", and defended the treatment of orcas in its parks, saying "no facility sets higher standards in husbandry, veterinary care and enrichment".

The court’s decision 
The court dismissed the action due to a lack of subject-matter jurisdiction. Dismissing the petition after two days of hearings, US District Judge Jeffrey T. Miller wrote "As ‘slavery’ and ‘involuntary servitude’ are uniquely human activities, as those terms have been historically and contemporaneously applied, there is simply no basis to construe the Thirteenth Amendment as applying to non-humans".

References

External links 
 "The Case Forever Known as Tilikum v. SeaWorld", Jennifer O'Connor, February 9, 2012, PETA website

Animal welfare and rights in the United States
United States Thirteenth Amendment case law
SeaWorld Parks & Entertainment
United States lawsuits
2012 in United States case law